Lithops fulviceps is a species of plant in the family Aizoaceae. It is endemic to Namibia.  Its natural habitats are rocky areas and cold deserts. It is threatened by habitat loss.

References

fulviceps
Endemic flora of Namibia
Least concern plants
Taxonomy articles created by Polbot
Taxa named by N. E. Brown